Brandon Lynch (born January 31, 1982) is a former American football linebacker and coach who is the cornerbacks coach for the Cleveland Browns of the National Football League (NFL). Brandon played high school football at Hephzibah High School. He was originally signed by the Tennessee Titans as an undrafted free agent in 2004. He played college football at Middle Tennessee State.
Lynch has also been a member of the Indianapolis Colts.

Professional Playing Career
Lynch went undrafted in 2004 but he was signed by the Tennessee Titans as an undrafted free agent. He was signed and released to the Colts’ practice squad in 2005 and in 2006 when the Colts won the Super bowl. 
In 2007, Lynch wanted to play so he began playing in the Canadian Football League. He played linebacker and safety for the Saskatchewan Roughriders for three seasons.

References

External links
Just Sports Stats

1982 births
Living people
American football linebackers
American football safeties
American football cornerbacks
American players of Canadian football
Canadian football linebackers
Cleveland Browns coaches
East Carolina Pirates football coaches
Indianapolis Colts players
Middle Tennessee Blue Raiders football players
Players of American football from Augusta, Georgia
Tennessee Titans players